Fannia is a very large genus of approximately 288 species of flies.  The genus was originally described by the French entomologist Jean-Baptiste Robineau-Desvoidy in 1830. A number of species were formerly placed in the genus Musca.

Description
The adults have plumose arista, with the first pre-sutural dorsocentral bristle over half than half as long as the second. Males without a lower orbital bristle.

Species list

Fannia abnormis (Stein, 1900)
Fannia abrupta Malloch, 1924
Fannia admirabilis Albuquerque, 1958
Fannia aequilineata Ringdahl, 1945
Fannia aethiops Malloch, 1913
Fannia alaskensis Chillcott, 1961
Fannia alpina Pont, 1970
Fannia albisquama Wang & Zhang, 2008
Fannia annosa Chillcott, 1961
Fannia anthracinalis Domínguez & Pont, 2014
Fannia arcuata Chillcott, 1961
Fannia arizonensis Chillcott, 1961
Fannia armata (Meigen, 1826)
Fannia atra (Stein, 1895)
Fannia atripes Stein, 1916
Fannia barbata (Stein, 1892)
Fannia bigelowi Chillcott, 1961
Fannia binotata Chillcott, 1961
Fannia biseta Wang & Zhang, 2008
Fannia borealis Chillcott, 1961
Fannia bradorei Chillcott, 1961
Fannia brevicauda Chillcott, 1961
Fannia brevipalpis Chillcott, 1961
Fannia brinae Albuquerque, 1951
Fannia brooksi Chillcott, 1961
Fannia canicularis (Linnaeus, 1761)
Fannia carbonaria (Meigen, 1826)
Fannia carbonella (Stein, 1895)
Fannia ceringogaster Chillcott, 1961
Fannia ciliatissima Chillcott, 1961
Fannia cinerea Chillcott, 1961
Fannia clara Collin, 1939
Fannia clavata Chillcott, 1961
Fannia collini d'Assis-Fonseca, 1966
Fannia columbiana Chillcott, 1961
Fannia conspicua Malloch, 1913
Fannia coracina (Loew, 1873)
Fannia corvina (Verrall, 1892)
Fannia cothurnata (Loew, 1873)
Fannia dianensis Wang & Zhang, 2011
Fannia difficilis (Stein, 1895)
Fannia doxonglaensis Wang & Zhang, 2008
Fannia elongata Chillcott, 1961
Fannia enigmata Chillcott, 1961
Fannia eremna Chillcott, 1961
Fannia falcata Chillcott, 1961
Fannia fasciculata (Loew, 1873)
Fannia fuscinata Chillcott, 1961
Fannia fuscitibia Stein, 1920
Fannia fuscula (Fallén, 1825)
Fannia garretti Chillcott, 1961
Fannia genualis (Stein, 1895)
Fannia gilvitarsis Chillcott, 1961
Fannia glaucescens (Zetterstedt, 1845)
Fannia gotlandica Ringdahl, 1926
Fannia grahami Chillcott, 1961
Fannia hinei Chillcott, 1961
Fannia hirticeps (Stein, 1892)
Fannia hirundinis Ringdahl, 1948
Fannia hollowayae Domínguez & Pont, 2014
Fannia immutica Collin, 1939
Fannia incisurata (Zetterstedt, 1838)
Fannia indica Chillcott, 1961
Fannia intermedia Chillcott, 1961
Fannia ipinensis Chillcott, 1961
Fannia krimensis Ringdahl, 1934
Fannia laqueorum Domínguez & Pont, 2014
Fannia latifrontalis Hennig, 1955
Fannia latipalpis (Stein, 1892)
Fannia lepida (Wiedemann, 1817)
Fannia leucogaster Chillcott, 1961
Fannia leucosticta (Meigen, 1838)
Fannia limbata Tiensuu, 1938
Fannia lineata (Stein, 1895)
Fannia lucida Chillcott, 1961
Fannia lucidula (Zetterstedt, 1860)
Fannia lugubrina (Zetterstedt, 1838)
Fannia lustrator (Harris, 1780)
Fannia macalpinei Chillcott, 1961
Fannia magnicornis Domínguez & Pont, 2014
Fannia mainling Wang & Zhang, 2008
Fannia mangerensis Domínguez & Pont, 2014
Fannia manicata (Meigen, 1826)
Fannia malagasica Pont, 2006
Fannia melania (Dufour, 1839)
Fannia melanura Chillcott, 1961
Fannia mercurialis Domínguez & Pont, 2014
Fannia meridionalis Chillcott, 1961
Fannia metallipennis (Zetterstedt, 1838)
Fannia micheneri Chillcott, 1961
Fannia minutipalpis (Stein, 1895)
Fannia mollissima (Haliday, 1840)
Fannia monilis (Haliday, 1838)
Fannia monticola Pont, 1996
Fannia moseri Chillcott, 1965
Fannia multiseta Wang & Zhang, 2008
Fannia multisetosa Chillcott, 1961
Fannia neomexicana Chillcott, 1961
Fannia neopolychaeta Chillcott, 1961
Fannia neotomaria Chillcott, 1961
Fannia nidica Collin, 1939
Fannia nigra Malloch, 1910
Fannia nigribasicosta Wang & Zhang, 2008
Fannia norvegica Ringdahl, 1934
Fannia novalis Pont, 1965
Fannia nudiseta Chillcott, 1961
Fannia operta Chillcott, 1961
Fannia oregonensis Chillcott, 1961
Fannia ornata (Meigen, 1826)
Fannia pallitibia (Rondani, 1866)
Fannia parva (Stein, 1895)
Fannia pauli Pont, 1997
Fannia pellucida (Stein, 1898) 
Fannia penepretiosa Chillcott, 1961
Fannia polychaeta (Stein, 1895)
Fannia postica (Stein, 1895)
Fannia posticata (Meigen, 1826)
Fannia presignis Chillcott, 1961
Fannia prolata Chillcott, 1961
Fannia pruinosa (Meigen, 1826)
Fannia pseudonorvegica d'Assis-Fonseca, 1966
Fannia pseudoscalaris Séguy, 1926
Fannia pubescens Stein, 1908
Fannia punctifemoralis Wang & Zhang, 2011
Fannia pusio (Wiedemann, 1830)
Fannia rabdionata Karl, 1940
Fannia ringdahlana Collin, 1939
Fannia rondanii (Strobl, 1893)
Fannia robusta Chillcott, 1961
Fannia scalaris (Fabricius, 1794)
Fannia scyphocerca Chillcott, 1961
Fannia sequoiae Chillcott, 1961
Fannia serena (Fallén, 1825)
Fannia serrata Chillcott, 1961
Fannia setifer Chillcott, 1961
Fannia shinahamae Chillcott, 1961
Fannia similis (Stein, 1895)
Fannia sociella (Zetterstedt, 1845)
Fannia spathiophora Malloch, 1918
Fannia speciosa (Villeneuve, 1898)
Fannia stigi Rognes, 1982
Fannia subatripes d'Assis-Fonseca, 1967
Fannia subpellucens (Zetterstedt, 1845)
Fannia subpubescens Collin, 1958
Fannia subsimilis Ringdahl, 1934
Fannia tescorum Chillcott, 1961
Fannia tibetana Wang & Zhang, 2008
Fannia trigonifera Chillcott, 1961
Fannia triregun Domínguez & Pont, 2014
Fannia tuberculata (Zetterstedt, 1849)
Fannia tundrarum Chillcott, 1961
Fannia tunisiae Chillcott, 1961
Fannia umbratica Collin, 1939
Fannia umbrosa (Stein, 1895)
Fannia ungulata Chillcott, 1961
Fannia variabilis Chillcott, 1961
Fannia verrallii (Stein, 1895)
Fannia vesparia (Meade, 1891)
Fannia vespertilionis Ringdahl, 1934

See also

References

Fanniidae
Schizophora genera
Taxa named by Jean-Baptiste Robineau-Desvoidy